Mr. Charles, also known as Monsieur Charle and Charles the Hungarian (fl. 1734–1755) was a travelling musician. Believed to be of French or Hungarian origin, he was known for his performance tours of England with his wife and son.

Mr. Charles first appeared in London in 1734. He performed on the French horn, clarinet, and chalumeau. He is considered one of the first clarinetists to perform in the UK. His last known concert was in 1755.

References

Clarinetists
Place of birth missing